Arya Gopi is a Malayalam poet from India. She has written five books in Malayalam and one in English. She  has won numerous awards and honours including Kerala Sahithya Akademi Kanakasree Award, Kerala Government Youth Icon Award, Kerala StateYouth Welfare Board Swami Vivekananda Yuva Pratibha Award,  Vyloppilli Award, ONV International Yuva Award,  Kakkad Award, VT Kumaran Master Award, etc.

Biography 
Born to noted Malayalam poet P K Gopi and Komalam on March 28, Arya Gopi has published five books in two languages – Malakha Matsyam (Stories, 2003), Jeevante Vaakkukal (Poems, 2006), Ochezhuthu (2020).
A regular face at literary events in Kerala, she recites poems at various programmes conducted by organisation such as Kendra/Kerala Sahitya Akademy, Mathrubhumi, Manorama, D C Books and Hindu dailies apart from various web and visual media.
 A first rank holder in MA English language and literature  from University of Calicut, Arya is now an assistant professor in English at Zamorin’s Guruvayurappan College, Kozhikode. She completed her PhD – Other India – A Socio Literary Analysis of Select Works of Mark Tully.

Selected works 

Ochezhuthukal, Perakkabooks, Malappuram, 2020
Jeevante Vakkukal (poems) D.C. Books, Kottayam, 2006
Malakha Matsyam (stories) Poorna Publications, Calicut, 2003

Awards and achievements

References 

Malayala Manorama dated March 9, 2017, " Yuvaprathibha puraskaram aaru perk", Malayalam Manorama, 09-03-2017

External links 
 Poem Recitation at Kochi International Book Festival (2015 video)
 http://onvfoundation.org/Harithamaanasam.html
 http://timesofindia.indiatimes.com/city/thiruvananthapuram/sugathakumari-bags-first-onv-literary-award/articleshow/58484998.cms
 http://www.thehindu.com/news/national/kerala/onv-literary-award-for-sugathakumari/article18360280.ece

Women writers from Kerala
Year of birth missing (living people)
Place of birth missing (living people)
Living people
Malayalam-language writers
Poets from Kerala
21st-century Indian poets
21st-century Indian women writers